Mikhail Aleksandrovich Bukin (born 4 October 1967 in Leningrad) is a former Russian football player and referee.

Referee career
Referee
Russian Second Division: 1999–2005
Russian First Division: 2001–2005

Assistant referee
Russian Second Division: 1998–2000
Russian First Division: 2000

References

1967 births
Footballers from Saint Petersburg
Living people
Soviet footballers
FC Dynamo Saint Petersburg players
FC Dynamo Bryansk players
Russian footballers
FC Tekstilshchik Kamyshin players
Russian Premier League players
FC Lada-Tolyatti players
FC Kuban Krasnodar players
Russian football referees
Association football defenders
FC Zenit Saint Petersburg players